Parliamentary elections were held in Estonia on 24 and 25 February 1938. The National Front for the Implementation of the Constitution won 64 of the 80 seats. In turn, the Front was essentially an enlarged version of the pro-government Patriotic League.
 
Of the 16 independents elected, six were members of the Democracy Group (composed of two former members of the National Centre Party, two Settlers and two of the Veterans' League), six of the Unity Group of Working People (composed of four leftist Socialists and two rightist Socialists), two were Independent Workers and two were members of the Russian Group.

Electoral system
Following the promulgation of a new constitution the voting age was raised to 22 years and only those who had been citizens for three years could vote, whilst minimum age for candidates was raised from 20 to 25.

Results

See also
VI Riigikogu

References

Parliamentary elections in Estonia
Estonia
1938 in Estonia
One-party elections
February 1938 events
Election and referendum articles with incomplete results